
Gmina Cmolas is a rural gmina (administrative district) in Kolbuszowa County, Subcarpathian Voivodeship, in south-eastern Poland.

Villages
Gmina Cmolas contains the villages and settlements of Cmolas, Hadykówka, Jagodnik, Ostrowy Baranowskie, Ostrowy Tuszowskie, Poręby Dymarskie, Toporów and Trzęsówka.

Neighbouring gminas
Gmina Cmolas is bordered by The Gminas of Baranów Sandomierski, Dzikowiec, Kolbuszowa, Majdan Królewski, Mielec, Niwiska and Tuszów Narodowy.

References
Polish official population figures 2006

Cmolas
Kolbuszowa County